A confusion network (sometimes called a word confusion network or informally known as a sausage) is a natural language processing method that combines outputs from multiple automatic speech recognition or machine translation systems. Confusion networks are simple linear directed acyclic graphs with the property that each a path from the start node to the end node goes through all the other nodes. The set of words represented by edges between two nodes is called a confusion set. In machine translation, the defining characteristic of confusion networks is that they allow multiple ambiguous inputs, deferring committal translation decisions until later stages of processing. This approach is used in the open source machine translation software Moses and the proprietary translation API in IBM Bluemix Watson.

References 

Machine translation
Natural language and computing
Natural language processing